Mark Todd may refer to:

 Mark Todd (politician) (born 1954), British Labour Party Member of Parliament 1997-2010
 Mark Todd (equestrian) (born 1956), New Zealand Equestrian horse rider and Thoroughbred trainer
 Mark Todd (footballer) (born 1967), English football player
 Mark Todd (police officer), civilian police officer who shot and disabled Nidal Malik Hasan during the Fort Hood shooting
 Blazing Skull aka Mark Todd, comic book character